Daphnella rissoides, common name the Rissoa-like pleurotoma, is a species of sea snail, a marine gastropod mollusk in the family Raphitomidae.

Description
The length of the shell attains 23 mm.

The smooth shell is shining and semitransparent. The first three whorls are longitudinally plaited, the rest is smooth. The body whorl shows a varix nearly opposite the aperture (accidental ?). The columella is spirally twisted. The outer lip is rather thickened and delicately denticulated within. The sinus is small and distinct. The color of the shell is whitish, washed with clouded yellow streaks, the apex pink.

Distribution
This marine species occurs off Aden, the Red Sea, the Philippines, New Caledonia and Queensland, Australia.

References

 Reeve, L.A. 1843. Monograph of the genus Pleurotoma. pls 1–18 in Reeve, L.A. (ed.). Conchologica Iconica. London : L. Reeve & Co. Vol. 1. 
 Jousseaume, F., 1896. Description d'une coquille nouvelle. Le Naturaliste 10(2): 43
 L.A. Reeve (1843) - Conchologia iconica, or, Illustrations of the shells of molluscous animals vol. 1 
 Souverbie, S.M. 1869. Diagnoses de Mollusques inédits provenant de la Nouvelle-Calédonie. Journal de Conchyliologie 17: 416-421
 Macandrew, R. 1870. Report on the testaceous Mollusca obtained during a dredging excursion in the Gulf of Suez in the months of February and March 1869. Annals and Magazine of Natural History 4 6: 429-450
 Hedley, C. 1922. A revision of the Australian Turridae. Records of the Australian Museum 13(6): 213–359, pls 42–56
 Dautzenberg, Ph. (1929). Mollusques testaces marins de Madagascar. Faune des Colonies Francaises, Tome III
 Powell, A.W.B. 1966. The molluscan families Speightiidae and Turridae, an evaluation of the valid taxa, both Recent and fossil, with list of characteristic species. Bulletin of the Auckland Institute and Museum. Auckland, New Zealand 5: 1–184, pls 1–23
 Maes, V.O. 1967. The littoral marine mollusks of Cocos-Keeling Islands (Indian Ocean). Proceedings of the Academy of Natural Sciences, Philadelphia 119: 93–217

External links
 Holotype in the MNHN, Paris
 
 Gastropods.com: Daphnella (Hemidaphne) rissoides

rissoides
Gastropods described in 1845